Riverside Farm is a historic farm complex in rural western Nelson County, Virginia. It is located on the south side of Patrick Henry Highway (Virginia State Route 151) west of Roseland, on the western shore of the Tye River. The main house is an 1841 late Federal period wood-frame house, and it is surrounded by a variety of domestic and agricultural outbuildings, including an ice house, poultry house, and smokehouse, all from the 1840s. Near the road stands a secondary complex that includes a mid-19th century tenant house. Development on the farm apparently began between 1831 and 1835 by James D. Goodwin.

The farm was listed on the National Register of Historic Places in 2016.

See also
National Register of Historic Places listings in Nelson County, Virginia

References

Farms on the National Register of Historic Places in Virginia
National Register of Historic Places in Nelson County, Virginia
Buildings and structures in Nelson County, Virginia
Federal architecture in Virginia
Historic districts on the National Register of Historic Places in Virginia